The Federal Bureau of Investigation (FBI) kept records on the American singer Michael Jackson, which were released under the Freedom of Information Act posthumously on December 22, 2009. In response to perceived threats against Jackson and allegations of child sexual assault made against him, the FBI made several investigations into Jackson, none of which led to charges. 

Between 1993 and 2005, Jackson was investigated by California law enforcement agencies due to allegations of child abuse; the FBI provided technical and investigative assistance. They also investigated threats made against Jackson and others by Frank Paul Jones, who was later imprisoned. These investigations occurred between 1993 and 2005. The FBI found no evidence of criminal conduct on Jackson's part.

The FBI files comprise 600 pages; 333 pages were released publicly, divided into seven parts. They include copies of letters from members of the public commenting on Jackson's performances, newspaper clippings, and various documents reporting that Jackson was the target of threats and extortion attempts. The files received extensive media coverage.

Content 
The FBI began monitoring Jackson in 1992, when they investigated death threats against him made by a man obsessed with Jackson's sister Janet. In 1993, following the first allegations of child sexual assault by Jackson, FBI agents began looking into Jackson's alleged involvement with young children; the FBI investigations continued for almost 10 years.

In 2004, the FBI assisted with investigations into child abuse allegations against Jackson. At Jackson's trial in 2005, Santa Maria law enforcement contacted the FBI as they feared the trial could be a "soft target" for terrorism. According to the files, the FBI ended its investigations into Jackson in 2005 and found no evidence of criminal conduct on his part. The FBI files released on Jackson comprise seven parts.

Part one: FBI monitoring tabloid articles on Jackson 
Part one consists of 10 pages, primarily legal documents and tabloid newspaper clippings. The clippings allege that Jackson and the British DJ Terance George had phone sex in 1979 when Jackson was 20 and George was 13. The FBI files show that it was George who contacted Jackson and that George had attempted to rekindle his friendship with Jackson when he visited London but was rebuffed by Jackson's security.

In 2003, 10 years after George accused Jackson, he recalled his 1979 interview with him in Louis Theroux’s documentary Louis, Martin & Michael. He said the allegation was made "without my authority" and had developed from a close friend who "knew about the story". George told Theroux that "the majority" of the allegations were true, but that the newspapers had "twisted" and sensationalized them. With no proof, no recorded phone call, no lawsuits filed and nothing reported to law enforcement, Legat London and the FBI took no further action.

Part two: forensics analysis of Jackson's computers 
Part two consists of 44 pages about the forensics analysis of Jackson's computers and hard drives. During investigatory raids on Jackson's properties in 2003, 16 hard drives were confiscated in total. What the FBI's Computer Analysis Response Team (CART) found on these hard drives was in a report addressed to Sheriff Jim Anderson, dated April 5, 2004. The FBI found nothing incriminating on the drives, and the computer history contained no record of accessing or searching for illegal material. On March 29, 2004, CART forwarded 4 DVDs to the Forensic Audio Video Image Analysis Unit (FAVIAU) with file formatting problems and requested that the files be converted to a readable format. Sometime after the conversion, it was noted that there were no "outstanding leads or evidence items".

Part three: LAPD seeks Mann Act assistance and investigators determine the credibility of other allegations 

Part three consists of 59 pages providing an early timeline for the first child abuse allegations against Jackson. On September 8, 1993, the Los Angeles Police Department (LAPD) asked the FBI to help prosecute Jackson under the Mann Act, also known as the White-Slave Traffic Act. The law prohibits the transportation of anyone over state borders for the purpose of illegal sexual acts and was first used as a tool for political prosecution against the boxing champion Jack Johnson. On September 8, 1993, the United States Attorney declined to prosecute Jackson for violating the Mann Act.

The remaining pages cover various allegations against Jackson throughout 1993, with many pages replicated from part one of the files. Other allegations tracked in newspaper clippings include detectives traveling to the Philippines to interview a couple who used to work for Jackson. Their claims were dismissed as not credible due to a dispute over back pay. 

Other accusations include a claim that Jackson sexually molested two Mexican boys in 1985 or 1986. The writer, whose name is redacted, said that the allegation was being investigated by the FBI and alleged that the government assisted in a cover-up because Jackson was to receive an honor in 1984 from the President at the White House. After checking their archives and investigating themselves, the FBI concluded that no such reference was found.

Part four: video analysis 
Part four consists of nine pages on the analysis of a multi-generational poor-quality VHS tape seized by US Customs in West Palm Beach, Florida, in 1995. The tape was labeled "Michael Jackson’s Neverland Favorites An All Boy Anthology"; the files do not mention that Jackson owned the tape or had any connection to it. The investigation of whether it contained child pornography was concluded on January 24, 1997. No charges were filed.

Part five: 2003–2005 period accusations 
Part five consists of 18 pages covering a brief timeline of the 2003–2005 accusations from an indictment, to arrest, to CART and the FBI's investigatory assistance, to the trial's acquittal. The documents reveal that police in Santa Barbara, where Jackson stood trial, contacted the FBI because they feared he might become a terrorist target. At the molestation trial, the FBI concluded there was little risk. They noted that a Nation of Islam follower and a New Black Panther Party member attended one court appearance. Both parties remained unnamed in the file. Jackson was acquitted of all charges on June 13, 2005.

Part six: death threats and extortion attempts 
Part six, the largest, consists of 199 pages. It covers death threats against Jackson and others by Frank Paul Jones, who served two years in prison for sending a letter that read: "I am going to Washington, D.C., to threaten to kill the president of the United States, George Bush." The letter also threatens Jackson; Jones wrote: "I will personally attempt to kill if he doesn't pay me my money." Jones was arrested for trespassing on June 22, 1992, at the Jackson family compound in Encino, California.

Part seven: law enforcement interviews the 1993 accuser for 2005 trial 
Part seven, the shortest, consists of five pages. It covers the investigators’ attempt to pursue the 1993 accuser as a second case to coincide with the 2003 accuser. After a meeting in June 2004 between Santa Barbara Assistant District Attorneys (SBADAs) and the FBI's Behavioral Analysis Unit (BAU), it was concluded that a federal case could still be pursued with the 1993 accuser. A conference call was held on August 30, 2004, when it was agreed that Santa Maria RA should open a case on the 1993 accuser. 

A meeting was held in New York in an attempt to persuade the 1993 accuser to testify for the 2005 trial. The 1993 accuser informed the two agents in the meeting that he would not testify against Jackson and would "legally fight any attempts to do so". A document dated December 9, 2004, indicates that the case was closed, citing "no outstanding leads or evidence items".

Media reaction 
News media began covering the content of the FBI files after they were released on December 22, 2009. These outlets included The Guardian, USA Today, Variety, MTV, CNN, Billboard, ABC News, CBC News, BBC, France 24, and Reuters. Brian Oxman, a former lawyer for the Jackson family, said the files contained no evidence that Jackson committed any crime and that it was "a vindication". A former FBI investigator said that due to local law enforcement's limited capabilities, it was common that the FBI get involved as they were well-resourced to assist in such manners. 

In 2013, a London tabloid, the Sunday People, alleged that "secret FBI files" revealed that Jackson had paid millions in hush money to dozens of boys he had abused. The reports were received with skepticism. CNN Special Investigations reporter Drew Griffin said it "sounds like recycled tabloid reports from 20 years ago". Thomas Mesereau, Jackson's 2005 criminal defense attorney, said that these claims were not in the FBI files and dismissed the report as "a bunch of utter nonsense". Diane Dimond, a critic of Jackson, said: "It is obvious the paper took this old story and proceeded to make it seem new by adding numbers to it ... The problem is there's no evidence to back up the claim that Jackson made that many payoffs."

In 2016, Radar Online alleged that child pornography had been found in the 2003 raid of Jackson's properties, though the FBI files state that no such evidence was found. The report cited documentation allegedly originating from the police department that had investigated Jackson. Kelly Hoover, a police spokesperson, said that the documents had come from the internet or unknown sources and that the department had released all of its reports. Judge Melville, the judge of Jackson's 2005 trial, signed a press statement stating that no child pornography or illegal material had been found in Jackson's possession or on his properties.

See also

Trial of Michael Jackson

References

Further reading
 Michael Jackson: The FBI Found Nothing (Black/White Version) by D. Francis and Daniel Francis

External links
Federal Bureau of Investigation: Michael Jackson 

FBI files
Federal Bureau of Investigation
Extortion